Twin Peak may refer to:

Twin Peaks, television series
The Twins, two mountains in Canada known as:
North Twin Peak
South Twin Peak

See also 
 Twin peak
 Double summit
 Double Peak (disambiguation)
 Twin peak sign in obstetric ultrasonography